The arts of Iran are one of the richest art heritages in world history and encompasses many traditional disciplines including architecture, painting, literature, music, weaving, pottery, calligraphy, metalworking and stonemasonry. There is also a very vibrant Iranian modern and contemporary art scene, as well as cinema and photography.  For a history of Persian visual art up to the early 20th century, see Persian art, and also Iranian architecture.

The Persian Fine Arts

The Persian rug

The art of rug weaving in  has its roots in the culture and customs of its people and their instinctive feelings. Weavers mix elegant patterns with a myriad of colors. The Iranian carpet is similar to the Persian garden: full of florae, birds, and beasts.

The colors are usually made from wild flowers, and are rich in colors such as burgundy, navy blue, and accents of ivory. The proto-fabric is often washed in tea to soften the texture, giving it a unique quality. Depending on where the rug is made, patterns and designs vary. And some rugs, such as Gabbeh, and Gelim have a variations in their textures and number of knots as well. Out of about 2 million Iranians who work in the trade, 1.2 million are weavers producing the largest amount of hand woven artistic carpets in the world.  exported $517 million worth of carpets in 2002.

The exceptional craftsmanship in weaving these carpets and silken textile thus caught the attention of the likes of Xuanzang, Jean-Baptiste Tavernier, and Jean Chardin.

Painting and miniature

Oriental historian Basil Gray believes Iran (Persia) " has o unique [sic] art to the world which is excellent in its kind".

Caves in Iran's Lorestan province exhibit painted imagery of animals and hunting scenes. Some such as those in Fars Province and Sialk are at least 5,000 years old.

Painting in Iran is thought to have reached a climax during the Tamerlane era when outstanding masters such as Kamaleddin Behzad gave birth to a new style of painting.

Paintings of the Qajar period, are a combination of European influences and Safavid miniature schools of painting such as those introduced by Reza Abbasi. Masters such as Kamal-ol-molk, further pushed forward the European influence in Iran. It was during the Qajar era when "Coffee House painting" emerged. Subjects of this style were often religious in nature depicting scenes from Shia epics and the like.

Pottery and ceramics

Prominent archeologist Roman Ghirshman believes "the taste and talent of this people [Iranians] can be seen through the designs of their earthen wares".

Of the thousands of archeological sites and historic ruins of Iran, almost every single one can be found to have been filled, at some point, with earthenware of exceptional quality. Thousands of unique vessels alone were found in Sialk and Jiroft sites.

The occupation of the potter ("kuzeh gar") has a special place in Persian literature.

Music

During the course of Iran's recorded history, a unique distinctive music developed accompanied by numerous musical instruments, several of which came to be the first prototypes of some modern musical instruments of today.

The earliest references to musicians in Iran are found in Susa and Elam in the 3rd millennium BC. Reliefs, sculptures, and mosaics such as those in Bishapur from periods of antiquity depict a vibrant musical culture.

Persian music in its contemporary form has its inception in the Naseri era, who ordered the opening of a "House of Crafts," where all master craftsmen would gather for designing instruments and practicing their art.

Literature

Persian literature is by far the most stalwart expression of the Iranian genius. While there are interesting works in prose, it is poetry where the Iranian literature shines at its most. Flourishing over a period of more than a millennium, it was esteemed and imitated well beyond the confines of the Iranian homeland. The literature of Iran's direct and recently lost territories in the Caucasus (most notably Azerbaijan), as well as Turkey and indirectly the Mughal Empire developed under its influence.

Some notable Iranian poets are: Ferdowsi, Khayyam, Hafiz, Attar, Sa'di, Nizami, Sanai, Rudaki, Rumi, Jami, Nima Yushij and Shahriar.

Environmental design

Architecture

The architecture of Iran is one with an exceedingly ancient Persian tradition and heritage. As Arthur Pope put it, "the meaningful Impact of Persian architecture is versatile. Not overwhelming but dignified, magnificent and impressive".

Persian gardens

The tradition and style in the garden design of Persian gardens (Persian باغ ایرانی) has influenced the design of gardens from Andalusia to India and beyond. The gardens of the Alhambra show the influence of Persian Paradise garden philosophy and style in a Moorish Palace scale from the era of Al-Andalus in Spain. The Taj Mahal is one of the largest Persian Garden interpretations in the world, from the era of the Mughal Empire in India.
Examples: see Category: Persian Gardens

Calligraphy

Says writer Will Durant: "Ancient Iranians with an alphabet of 36 letters, used skins and pen to write, Instead of earthen tablets". Such was the creativity spent on the art of writing. The significance of the art of calligraphy in works of pottery, metallic vessels, and historic buildings is such that they are deemed lacking without the adorning decorative calligraphy.

Illuminations, and especially the Quran and works such as the Shahnameh, Divan Hafez, Golestan, Bostan et al. are recognized as highly invaluable because of their delicate calligraphy alone. Vast quantities of these are scattered and preserved in museums and private collections worldwide, such as the Hermitage Museum of St. Petersburg and Washington's Freer Gallery of Art among many others.

Styles:

 Shekasteh
 Nasta'liq
Naskh
Mohaqqaq

Tilework
In the old days, Kashan (kash + an which literally means "land of tiles") and Tabriz were the two famous centers of Iranian mosaic and tile industry.

Cinema

With 300 international awards in the past 25 years, films from Iran continue to be celebrated worldwide. Few of the best known directors are Abbas Kiarostami, Mohsen Makhmalbaf, and Majid Majidi.

Metalwork (Ghalam-zani)

Luristan bronzes, probably from around 1000-650 BCE, are a distinctive group of small objects decorated with figures of animals and human in inventive and vigorous poses.

Khatam-kari

Delicate and meticulous marquetry, produced since the Safavid period: at this time, khatam was so popular in the court that princes learned this technique at the same level of music or painting. In the 18th and 19th centuries, katahm declined, before being stimulated under the reign of Reza Shah, with the creation of craft schools in Tehran, Isfahan, and Shiraz. "Khatam" means "incrustation", and "Khatam-kari", "incrustation work". This craft consists in the production of incrustation patterns (generally star shaped), with thin sticks of wood (ebony, teak, ziziphus, orange, rose), brass (for golden parts), camel bones (white parts). Ivory, gold or silver can also be used for collection objects. Sticks are assembled in triangular beams, themselves assembled and glued in a strict order to create a cylinder, 70 cm in diameter, whose cross-section is the main motif: a six-branch star included in a hexagon.  These cylinders are cut into shorter cylinders, and then compressed and dried between two wooden plates, before being sliced for the last time, in 1 mm wide tranches.  These sections are ready to be plated and glued on the object to be decorated, before lacquer finishing. The tranche can also be softened through heating in order to wrap around objects. Many objects can be decorated in this fashion, such as: jewellery/decorative boxes, chessboards, cadres, pipes, desks, frames or some musical instruments. Khatam can be used on Persian miniature, realizing true work of art.

Coming from techniques imported from China and improved by Persian know-how, this craft existed for more than 700 years and is still perennial in Shiraz and Isfahan.

Mina-kari

 Enamel working and decorating metals with colorful and baked coats is one of the distinguished courses of art in Isfahan . Mina, is defined as some sort of glasslike colored coat which can be stabilized by heat on different metals particularly copper. Although this course is of abundant use industrially for producing metal and hygienic dishes, it has been paid high attention by painters, goldsmiths and metal engravers since long times ago.
In the world, it is categorized into three kinds as below:
painting enamel
Charkhaneh or chess like enamel
Cavity enamel.
What of more availability in Isfahan is the painting enamel of which a few have remained in the museums of Iran and abroad indicating that Iranian artists have been interested in this art and used it in their metal works since the Achaemenian and the Sassanid dynasties. The enamels being so delicate, we do not have many of them left from the ancient times. Some documents indicate that throughout the Islamic civilization of and during the Seljuk, Safavid and Zand dynasties there have been outstanding enameled dishes and materials. Most of the enameled dishes related to the past belong to the Qajar dynasty between the years 1810–1890 AD. There have also remained some earrings. Bangles, boxes, water pipe heads, vases, and golden dishes with beautiful paintings in blue and green colors from that time, Afterwards, fifty years of stagnation caused by the World War I and the social revolution followed. However, again the enamel red color, having been prepared, this art was fostered from the quantity and quality points of view through the attempts bestowed by Ostad Shokrollah Sani'e zadeh, the outstanding painter of Isfahan in 1935 and up to then for forty years.

Now after a few years of stagnation since 1992, this art has started to continue its briskness having a lot of distinguished artists working in this field. To prepare an enameled dish, the following steps are used.
First, choose the suitable dish by the needed size and shape which is usually made by a coppersmith. Then, it is bleached through enameled working which is known as the first coat. It is then put into a seven hundred and fifty degree furnace. At this stage, the enameled metal will be coated with better enamels a few more times and again reheated. The dish is then ready to be painted. The Isfahanian artists, having been inspired by their traditional plans as arabesque, khataii (flowers and birds) and using fireproof paints and special brushes, have made painting of Isfahan monuments such as step, the enameled material is put into the furnace again and heated at five hundred degrees. This causes the enameled painting to be stabilized on the undercoat, creating a special "shining" effect. Most of today's enamel workings are performed on dishes, vases, boxes and frames in various size.

Relief and sculpture

Relief carving has a history dating back thousands of years, especially in rock reliefs. Elamite reliefs are still to be found in Iran with Persepolis being a mecca of relief creations of antiquity.

Other handicrafts
Galesh
Giveh
Iranian Termeh
Persian Jewels
Qalamkari|Ghalamkar

See also
Azerbaijani art
Culture of Iran
Cultural Heritage, Handcrafts and Tourism Organization
Graffiti in Tehran
International rankings of Iran
Iran's House of Art
Iranian modern and contemporary art
List of Persian painters
Persian theatre
Qajar art
Safavid art

Gallery

References

Further reading

External links

Iranian Artists and Persian Art Resource
Iranian Underground Arts Media
Iran Arts and Entertainment Directory
Central Asian miniature painting

 
 
Persian handicrafts